Sparkford Wood is an 8.4 hectare (20.7 acre) biological Site of Special Scientific Interest at Sparkford in Somerset, notified in 1954.

Sparkford Wood is a broadleaved semi-natural woodland situated on heavy fertile soils. It dates from at least the 18th Century and its survival amongst the prime agricultural land of south-east Somerset makes it unique. The ground flora, which includes abundant Bluebell (Hyacinthoides non-scriptus), varies in conjunction with differences in soils which range from mildly calcareous to acid. The woodland has a large population of homostyle Primroses (Primula vulgaris) which have been the subject of some classic genetic studies. These plants are unique in that they represent a self-fertile form of a normally self-sterile species, and they are of international significance in providing research opportunities.

References 

Sites of Special Scientific Interest in Somerset
Sites of Special Scientific Interest notified in 1954
Woodland Sites of Special Scientific Interest
Forests and woodlands of Somerset